The Northern Texas PGA Championship is a golf tournament that is the championship of the Northern Texas section of the PGA of America. Benny Passons, club pro playing out of Creekview Golf Club in Texas, holds the record for most victories with six. No PGA Tour winners have also won Northern Texas PGA Championship.

Winners

 2022 Matt Ryba
 2021 Chad Moscovic
 2020 Chad Moscovic
 2019 Matt Lohmeyer
 2018 Greg Gregory
 2017 Ben Kern
 2016 Benjamin Cuzen
 2015 Chad Moscovic
 2014 Cameron Doan
 2013 Stuart Deane
 2012 Stuart Deane
 2011 Dean Larsson
 2010 Jamie Elliott
 2009 Dean Larsson
 2008 Perry Arthur
 2007 Chad Williams
 2006 Lindy Miller
 2005 Matt MacConnell
 2004 Perry Arthur
 2003 Todd Sandow
 2002 Perry Arthur
 2001 Bob Elliott
 2000 Tim Hobby
 1999 Perry Arthur
 1998 Tim Hobby
 1997 Gordon Johnson
 1996 Doug Higgins, Jr.
 1995 Ed Gatlin
 1994 Benny Passons
 1993 Terry Dear
 1992 Lindy Miller
 1991 Dow Finsterwald, Jr.
 1990 Benny Passons
 1989 Bob Smith
 1988 Don Robertson
 1987 Don Robertson
 1986 Lindy Miller
 1985 Robert Hoyt
 1984 Dwight Nevil
 1983 Robert Hoyt
 1982 Benny Passons
 1981 Benny Passons
 1980 Benny Passons
 1979 Benny Passons

References

External links
PGA of America – Northern Texas section

Golf in Texas
PGA of America sectional tournaments
Recurring sporting events established in 1979